Zgorzelec Miasto (lit. Zgorzelec Town) is one of the two railway stations in the town of Zgorzelec, Lower Silesia, Poland.

Since May 2007, the three-storey building located at the station is owned by the railway. After reconstruction, which is still pending, the building will become a combined railway and bus station with a shopping gallery. Until then, the ticket office serving the station is located in a kiosk nearby.

Train services
The station is on PKP PLK's railway line no. 278, which connects Zgorzelec to Węgliniec, and is served by Koleje Dolnośląskie, with eleven trains in each direction on weekdays. Additionally, Zgorzelec Miasto station was served by three daily Regional-Express trains running between Wrocław Główny and Dresden Hauptbahnhof from March 2009 until December 2018 (except for a few months in 2015). Since mid-December 2018 these trains run between Dresden, Zgorzelec and Węgliniec only.

The station is served by the following service(s):

 Intercity services (IC) Zgorzelec - Legnica - Wrocław - Ostrów Wielkopolski - Łódź - Warszawa
Regional services (PR) Goerlitz (Görlitz station) - Żary - Zielona Góra Główna

References

External links
 
 Koleje Dolnośląskie website

Miasto
Zgorzelec
Railway stations in Poland opened in 1948